Aldania raddei  is a  butterfly found in the  East Palearctic (Amur, Ussuri) that belongs to the browns family.

Description from Seitz

raddei Brem. (55d) stands entirely apart in facies; a remarkable species, which must be placed in the present genus [Neptis] as it agrees with the same in its morphological characters. Moore has erected for its reception a special genus, Aldania. Ground-colour white, dusted with grey-brown at the margins, the base and along the veins, the veins themselves blackish, a row of dark lunules along the margin, being especially distinct on the underside. — Amurland: Bureja Mts., Ussuri.

Biology
The larva feeds  on Ulmus propinqua.

Etymology
The name honours Gustav Radde.

See also
List of butterflies of Russia

References

Limenitidinae
Butterflies described in 1861
Butterflies of Asia
Taxa named by Otto Vasilievich Bremer